Afonso of Lencastre (1597–1654), was a Portuguese nobleman, son of the 3rd Dukes of Aveiro, Álvaro and Juliana of Lencastre. This family descended from the Infante George of Lencastre, therefore they had royal blood.

By a royal decree dated from 8 April 1627, King Philip III of Portugal (aka Philip IV of Spain) granted him the new title of Marquis of Porto Seguro.

In spite of the Portuguese revolution of 1 December 1640, Afonso remained faithful to the Spanish Habsburgs. To reward his fidelity, King Philip IV granted him, by a decree issued on 23 March 1642, the new titles of Duke of Abrantes and Marquis of Sardoal. However, as Philip IV was no longer King of Portugal, these two titles were never recognise by the Portuguese authorities.

D. Afonso was born in his family palace, in Azeitão (near Setúbal), Portugal, and, on 15 July 1627, he married a Spanish lady, Ana de Sande de Padilla, 2nd Marchioness of Valdefuentes. They had 4 children:
 Alvaro (1630- ? ), died in childhood;
 Luís, died in childhood;
 Agustin de Lencastre Padilla y Bobadilla (1639–1720), Duke of Abrantes. Married to Joana de Noronha de Silva (c.1640-1690). 
 Maria (1639–1692), married in 1654 to the Spanish Pedro de Leiva-Lacerda, Marquis de Landrada.

Ancestry

Bibliography
"Nobreza de Portugal e do Brasil" – Vol. III, page 173. Published by Zairol Lda., Lisbon 1989.

Portuguese nobility
101
1597 births
1654 deaths